The year 2023 will be the 8th year in the history of the Brave Combat Federation, a mixed martial arts promotion based in Bahrain. For 2023, besides its own channels Brave CF announced official distribution partnerships with DAZN and Fight Network, to broadcast the promotion's Pay-per-view events.

List of events

BRAVE CF 69 

BRAVE CF 69 was a mixed martial arts event held by Brave Combat Federation on February 18, 2023 at the Stark Arena in Belgrade, Serbia.

Background 
Abdisalam Kubanychbek of Kyrgyzstan, the interim lightweight champion of BRAVE CF, will face Kamil Magomedov of Russia in the main event for the chance to unify the 155-pound global championship. This situation developed after Ahmed Amir, a previous lineal champion, had his title removed because of doubts about his ability to compete again.

The mouthwatering Heavyweight fight between Serbia's Darko Stosic and Bahrain's Shamil Gaziev serves as the co-main event. Gaziev, a former amateur champion in Europe, Asia, and Africa, is looking to improve to 2-0 in BRAVE Combat Federation after a good start at BRAVE CF 65. He is unbeaten since going professional. After competing in many well-known promotions, Stosic makes his promotional debut and will enter the BRAVE CF cage with a lot of anticipation around him. Darko's first match on home turf since 2017 will take place there.

Aleksandar "Joker" Ilic, a local celebrity, competes against Marcin Naruszczka of Poland in the third and final fight of the evening in a 90-kilogram catchweight match. When the bout between "Joker" and Brazil's Cleber "Clebinho" Sousa was cancelled, Naruszczka was given the chance to step in and shock the world and achieve the biggest victory of his career - in front of a crowd that hadn't seen their hero fight live since 2018.

Results

See also 

 List of current Brave CF fighters
 List of current mixed martial arts champions
 2023 in UFC
 2023 in Bellator MMA
 2023 in ONE Championship
 2023 in Absolute Championship Akhmat
 2023 in Konfrontacja Sztuk Walki
 2023 in Rizin Fighting Federation
 2023 in AMC Fight Nights
 2023 in Road FC
 2023 Professional Fighters League season
 2023 in Eagle Fighting Championship

References 

Brave Combat Federation
Brave Combat Federation
Brave Combat Federation